Anton Kralj (born 12 March 1998) is a Swedish footballer who plays as a left-back for Hammarby IF in Allsvenskan.

References

External links 
 Anton Kralj at Fotbolltransfers 
 National team profile 

1998 births
Living people
Swedish footballers
Malmö FF players
Gefle IF players
Sandefjord Fotball players
Degerfors IF players
Hammarby Fotboll players
Superettan players
Norwegian First Division players
Eliteserien players
Allsvenskan players
Association football defenders
Swedish expatriate footballers
Expatriate footballers in Norway
Swedish expatriate sportspeople in Norway
Sweden youth international footballers